The following outline is provided as an overview of and topical guide to the visual arts:

Visual arts – class of art forms, including painting, sculpture, photography, printmaking and others, that focus on the creation of works which are primarily visual in nature. Visual Arts that produce three-dimensional objects, such as sculpture and architecture, are known as plastic arts.  The current usage of visual arts includes fine arts as well as crafts, but this was not always the case.

Types of visual art

 Architecture, process and product of planning, designing and construction. Architectural works, in the material form of buildings, are often perceived as cultural and political symbols and as works of art.
 Arts and crafts
 Asemic writing
 Animation
 Cartoon
 Ceramic art
 Collage
 Comics
 Conceptual art
 Decollage
 Decorative art
 Design, as a verb, it refers to the process of originating and developing a plan for a new object (machine, building, product, etc.). As a noun, it is used both for the final plan or proposal (a drawing, model, or other description), or the result of implementing that plan or proposal (the object produced).
 Fashion design
 Garden design
 Graphic design
 Motion graphic design
 Web design, creation and maintenance of websites
 Digital art
 Computer art
 Internet art
 Drawing
 Embroidery
 Film
 Found object
 Glass art
 Graffiti
 Illustration
 Concept art
 Installation art
 Lacquerware
 Land art
 Mail art
 Mixed media
 Narrative Art
 Textile arts
 Dyeing
 Painting
 Paper art
 Calligraphy
 Origami
 Photography
 Printmaking
 Etching
 Lithography
 Screen-printing
 Rock balancing
 Sculpture
 Street art
 Tattoos
 Typography
 Video art
 Visual poetry

History of the visual arts

 History of animation
 Arts and Crafts movement
 History of ceramic art
 History of comics
 History of conceptual art
 History of decorative arts
 History of drawing
 History of fashion design
 History of film
 History of graffiti
 History of illustration
 History of installation art
History of mixed media
 History of painting
 History of photography
 History of printmaking
 History of etching
 History of lithography
 History of screen-printing
 History of sculpture
 History of video art

Elements of art 
Elements of art – shape, form, value, line, color, space and texture
 Shape – area defined by edges
 Form – perceived volume or dimensionality
 Value – use of lightness (tint, or white) and darkness (shade, or black) in a piece of art
 Line – straight or curved marks that span a distance between two points. For example, see line art.
 Color – produced when light, striking an object, is reflected back to the eye.
 Properties of color
 Hue – red, yellow, blue, green, etc.
 Intensity
 Value (brightness)
 Space – area that an artist provides for a particular purpose. Space includes the background, foreground and middle ground, and refers to the distances or area(s) around, between, and within things.
 Texture – the way a three-dimensional work actually feels when touched, or the visual "feel" of a two-dimensional work

General visual art concepts

Principles of art

Visual artists
 List of animators
 List of fashion designers
 List of film and television directors
 List of painters
 List of photographers
 List of sculptors
 List of Stone Age art
 List of studio potters
 List of people associated with the Académie Julian

See also

 Art
 List of artistic media
 Timeline of art
 The arts
 Visual Arts in Hong Kong

External links

 ArtLex – online dictionary of visual art terms (archived 24 April 2005)
 Timeline of Art History by the Metropolitan Museum of Art.

Visual arts
Visual arts
 1
Wikipedia missing topics
Lists of visual art topics